Moullava is a genus of flowering plants in the legume family, Fabaceae. It belongs to the subfamily Caesalpinioideae.

Species
Moullava comprises the following species:
 Moullava digyna (Rottl.) E.Gagnon & G.P.Lewis—Teri pod
 Moullava spicata (Dalzell) Nicolson
 Moullava tortuosa (Roxb.) E.Gagnon & G.P.Lewis
 Moullava welwitschiana (Oliv.) E.Gagnon & G.P.Lewis

References

Caesalpinieae
Fabaceae genera